Andrej Hryc (30 November 1949 – 31 January 2021) was a Slovak actor. He appeared in more than fifty films since 1976.

After 1989, he founded Twist, an independent radio station, running it until 2004.

Selected filmography

References

External links
 

1949 births
2021 deaths
Slovak male film actors
20th-century Slovak male actors
21st-century Slovak male actors
People from Bratislava
Deaths from leukemia
Deaths from cancer in Slovakia